First Cabinet of Donald Tusk was the government of Poland from 16 November 2007 to 18 November 2011, sitting in the Council of Ministers during the 6th legislature of the Sejm and the 7th legislature of the Senate. It was appointed by President Lech Kaczyński on 16 November 2007 and passed the vote of confidence in Sejm on 24 November 2007. Led by the centre-right politician Donald Tusk it was supported by the coalition of two parties: the liberal conservative Civic Platform (PO) and the agrarian Polish People's Party (PSL).

Key

The Cabinet 

Tusk, Donald
Cabinet of Donald Tusk
Cabinet of Donald Tusk
2007 establishments in Poland
2011 disestablishments in Poland
Cabinets established in 2007
Cabinets disestablished in 2011